Mavilodan Kunjikannan (3 March 1926 – 30 June 2010), popularly known as Kunjikannan Mash or Kunjikannan Master, was a journalist, Gandhian, and educational and social activist among tribals in Wayanad district of Kerala, India. He wrote for the Malayalam language newspaper Mathrubhumi starting in 1970. He also worked as reporter for Thozhilali, a newspaper published in Thrissur, Kerala. He was president of Kalpetta Girijan Co-Operative Society, and was a member of the Kerala Tribal Board, the State Orphanage Control Board and the Kerala Pradesh Congress Committee.

References

External links 
 

1926 births
2010 deaths
Indian activist journalists